Raptor is a bipedal robot which was designed and conceived in 2014 by the Korea Advanced Institute of Science and Technology (KAIST). It has a top speed of 46 km/h, making it the second fastest robot after the Cheetah, and the fastest bipedal robot worldwide. Designers at the KAIST took their inspiration from the Velociraptor, a bipedal dinosaur which balances itself with its tail. The robot moves itself with a pair of carbon / epoxy composite blade legs.

Bibliography 

Robots of South Korea